Laâyoune-Boujdour-Sakia El Hamra was one of the sixteen regions of Morocco from 1997 to 2015. Its capital was Laayoune. In September 2015, the region was combined with Es-Semara Province in Guelmim-Es Semara to form the new region of Laâyoune-Sakia El Hamra.

Geography
The region was bordered to the east by the region of Guelmim-Es Semara. To the south was the region of Oued Ed-Dahab-Lagouira, entirely within the Western Sahara. The east of the region bordered the Mauritanian region of Tiris Zemmour. Laâyoune-Boujdour-Sakia El Hamra had a coastline on the Atlantic Ocean, facing the Spanish Canary Islands.

The region consisted of the following provinces:

 Boujdour Province
 Laâyoune Province
 Tarfaya Province

Municipalities by population (2004 census)
The capital Laayoune contained 73% of the region's population. Of the four municipalities, only Tarfaya was outside the disputed area.

 Laayoune, Laâyoune Province: 179,542
 Boujdour, Boujdour Province: 36,731
 El Marsa, Laâyoune Province: 10,229
 Tarfaya, Tarfaya Province: 5,615

References

Former regions of Morocco
Geography of Western Sahara
States and territories established in 1997
States and territories disestablished in 2015
Laâyoune-Sakia El Hamra